Yelena Cardeso Hernández (born 11 April 2001) is a Cuban footballer who plays as a defender for the Cuba women's national team.

International career
Cardeso capped for Cuba at senior level during the 2020 CONCACAF Women's Olympic Qualifying Championship qualification.

References

2001 births
Living people
Cuban women's footballers
Cuba women's international footballers
Women's association football defenders